The 2014 Vancouver Whitecaps FC season was the Whitecaps' fourth season in Major League Soccer, the top tier of soccer in the United States and Canada.

Season overview

December 

December 11, Brad Knighton was traded to the New England Revolution for a conditional 2015 draft pick.

December 18, Corey Hertzog is claimed on re-entry waivers by Seattle Sounders FC.

Carl Robinson became the new head coach on December 16, 2013. Club president Bob Lenarduzzi stated that "there was no deliberate attempt" to "go Latin this season."

January 

January 16, On the first day of the 2014 MLS SuperDraft the Vancouver Whitecaps selected Christian Dean with the 3rd overall pick and Andre Lewis with the 7th overall pick. In the 2nd round the Whitecaps selected Mamadou Diof with the 30th overall pick. After the draft it was revealed that Andre Lewis had signed a contract with the New York Cosmos of the NASL and will be on loan to MLS and Vancouver will own his MLS rights.

January 17, Camilo Sanvezzo is sold to Querétaro F.C. of Mexican Liga MX for a reported transfer fee of $2,500,000

January 21, 2014 MLS Superdraft rounds three to five where conducted on this day. Whitecaps drafter Michael Calderon with the 64th pick.

January 27, Whitecaps acquired Steven Beitashour from the San Jose Earthquakes and signed former San Jose player Mehdi Ballouchy to a contract that they claimed in the 2013 MLS Re-Entry Draft

February 

February 5, Whitecaps announce that they have brought in forward Nicolás Mezquida and brought in Sebastián Fernández on loan from Boston River.

February 18, Whitecaps sign goalkeeper Paolo Tornaghi

February 26, Whitecaps acquire designated player Matias Laba from Toronto FC for future considerations rumoured to be $2,500,000. In another move the Whitecaps traded Daigo Kobayashi rights to the New England Revolution for a fourth round draft pick.

March 

March 5, Whitecaps signed Pedro Morales on a free transfer from La Liga Malaga CF and made him a designated player joining Laba and Kenny Miller as DP's on the team. Also team favourite Matt Watson was traded to Chicago Fire for a 2014 international roster spot.

March 8, Whitecaps opened the season with a 4–1 victory over the NY Redbulls. Caps got a brace from Kenny Miller and goals from newcomers Sebastian Fernandez and Pedro Morales. With the victory the Whitecaps improved to 4–0 in season opening games since joining the MLS.

March 16, After going down 1–0 on an Erick Torres goal, Kekuta Manneh got the game tying goal in the 81st min to earn the Whitecaps a draw versus Chivas USA.

March 22, David Ousted earned his 1st clean sheet of the season with a 0–0 draw on the road versus the New England Revolution.

March 29, Jordan Harvey opened the scoring with his 1st goal of the season. Kenny Miller scored on a penalty kick to put the Whitecaps up 2–0 before settling for a 2–1 victory over Houston Dynamo.

 Whitecaps finished March (two wins, two draws and no losses)

April 

April 5, Darren Mattocks put the Whitecaps up 1–0 before Colorado Rapids got a brace from Jose Mari to give the Rapids a 2–1 victory.

April 12, Robbie Keane scored the lone goal to give the LA Galaxy a 1–0 victory.

April 19, Mattocks scored to tie the game 1–1. Down 2–1 after a Galaxy goal, Manneh earned the Whitecaps the 2–2 draw versus the LA Galaxy with a goal in the 86th minute.

April 26, After going down 2–0 in the opening 9 minutes the Whitecaps fought back to earn a 2–2 draw versus Real Salt Lake with goals in the 86th min by Nicolas Mezquida and the 94th min by Sebastian Fernandez.

 Whitecaps finished April (no wins, two draws, and two losses)

May 

May 3, Manneh opened the scoring to put the Whitecaps up 1–0. Whitecaps then got a brace by Morales with goals in the 19th and 20th min to give the Caps a 3–0 lead. Chris Wondolowski scored to in the 45th and 90th mins but it was not enough. Whitecaps held on for a 3–2 victory over San Jose Earthquakes.

May 4, Kenny Miller and the Whitecaps agree to a mutual contract termination effective immediately. Miller signs with the Rangers in Scotland after time with the club in the past.

May 7, after going down 2–0 versus Toronto FC, Manneh scored in the 92nd min to loss 2–1 in the 2014 Amway Canandian Championship first leg.

May 10, Ousted earned his 2nd clean sheet of the season with Erik Hurtado scoring the lone goal in the 1–0 victory over Columbus Crew.

May 14, going down 1–0 (3–1 agg) in the 4th minute, the Whitecaps fought back to a 3–3 agg score versus Toronto FC with goals by Hurtado and Morales. After no score in extra time the game went to penalty kicks where TFC won 4–3 and advanced to the Amway final versus Montreal Impact.

May 24, after goals by Hurtado and Gershon Koffie to go up 2–1 a controversial penalty call on Jay DeMerit let the Seattle Sounders FC leave Vancouver with a 2–2 draw.

 Whitecaps finished May (three wins, one draw and one loss)

June 

June 1, Whitecaps got a brace by Morales and goals by Hurtado and Harvey to hold on for a 4–3 victory versus Portland Timbers.

June 7, Hurtado and Mezquida put the Whitecaps up 2–0 versus the Philadelphia Union before Philadelphia scored 3 straight to gain a 3–2 lead. Morales scored in the 81st minute on a penalty kick to earn a tough 3–3 draw.

June 25, Whitecaps settled for their second 0–0 draw of the season when they played the Montreal Impact. Ousted earned his 3rd clean sheet of the season.

June 28, Whitecaps failed to score for the 2nd straight game and their winless streak extended to three games with a 2–0 loss to the Colorado Rapids.

 Whitecaps finished June (one win, two draws and one loss)

July 

July 5, in front of an over capacity crown over 22,500 Fernandez scored in the lone goal in the 12th min to give the Whitecaps a 1–0 win over the Sounders.

July 8, Whitecaps announce they are looking into a partnership with the city of New Westminster, BC to field a USL Pro team in Queens Park starting in the 2015 season.

July 11, Whitecaps announced that Russell Teibert has agreed to a contract extension with the club. Per Major League Soccer and club policy, terms of the contract were not disclosed.

July 12, after Carlyle Mitchell scored to give the Whitecaps a 1–0 lead, Chivas USA came back with three straight goals to earn the 3–1 victory.

July 16, in a rematch of the Amway semi-final the Whitecaps and Toronto FC played to a 1–1 draw. Whitecaps got the goal by Mattocks.

July 19, a Mattocks 73rd min penalty kick earned a 1–1 draw with Real Salt Lake. it was the 2nd game in a row where the Whitecaps blew a 1–0 lead.

July 24, Whitecaps captain Jay DeMerit announces his retirement from professional soccer after his second foot injury in two years. Pedro Morales is named as captain until end of season.

July 27, 3rd straight blown lead and 3rd straight draw with a 2–2 game versus FC Dallas. Mattocks opened the scoring in the 11th minute. A penalty kick by Morales in the 83rd min earned the hard-fought draw.

July 30, Whitecaps settled for a 0–0 draw with Chicago Fire. It was the third 0–0 draw if the season and Ousted's 5th clean sheet.

 Whitecaps finished July (One win, three draws and one loss)

August 

August 8, Whitecaps sign central back Kendall Waston from Deportivo Saprissa.

August 10, after a Sporting KC own goal to give the Whitecaps a 1–0 lead, Mattocks scored to give the Whitecaps a 2–0 victory who extended their unbeaten streak to five games (1 win 4 draws).

August 16, Whitecaps and Chivas USA played to a 0–0 draw to extend the Whitecaps' unbeaten streak to seven games. It was the Whitecaps fourth scoreless draw of the season and Ousted earned his seventh clean sheet of the season.

August 21, Whitecaps announced that Nigel Reo-Coker has been traded to Chivas USA for Argentina winger Mauro Rosales.

August 23, Whitecaps lost 2–0 to LA Galaxy for their first loss in six games and only the team's fifth loss since October 19, 2013. This game saw the debuts for Kendall Waston and Mauro Rosales.

August 28, Whitecaps announced that defender Jordan Harvey has agree to a contract extension with the club. Per Major League Soccer and club policy, terms of the contract were not disclosed.

August 30, Whitecaps fell 3–0 to Cascadia rival Portland Timbers. It was the third game in a row where the Whitecaps failed to score.

 Whitecaps finished August (One win, one draws and two loss)September

September 3, the New Westminster Chamber of Commerce, Queen's Park Residents' Association, and Royal City Youth Soccer Club came together today to provide their support for bringing a Whitecaps FC USL PRO team to New Westminster in 2015.

September 6, the Whitecaps and D.C. United played to a 0–0 draw. Ousted earned his 8th clean sheet of the season.

September 10, Whitecaps earned a 2–0 victory over the visiting San Jose Earthquakes. Morales scored his team leading 9th goal of season in all competitions in 39th minute. Kendall Waston opened his scoring account with the Whitecaps with a header off a Morales cross in the 57th minute. Ousted earned his MLS leading 9th clean sheet of the season.

September 13, Whitecaps lost 2–1 to FC Dallas. Blas Perez scored a brace for FC Dallas and Erik Hurtado scored the only goal for the Caps.

September 15, Whitecaps announced a pre-contract signing of young Canadian residency player Marco Bustos to a home grown player contract. His contract will take effect January 2015. They also announce the home-grown player contract signing of young Canadian Kianz Froese. The city of New Westminster voted against modifications to Queens Park Stadium to allow a Whitecaps USL Pro team. The Whitecaps eventually decided to locate the team in Thunderbird Stadium on the UBC campus.

 Current roster 

 

 Transfers 

 In 

 Out 

 Technical staff 

 Management 

 Major League Soccer 

 Preseason 

 Rose City Invitational 

 Regular season 

 Results 

All times listed using Pacific Time Zone.

 Tables 

 Western Conference 

 Overall 

Playoffs

Knockout round

 Canadian Championship 

 Cascadia Cup 

The Whitecaps have had a long-standing rivalry with the Pacific Northwest clubs Seattle Sounders FC and Portland Timbers, dating back to the 1970s when ancestry clubs of the same name played in the original and now-defunct North American Soccer League. The tri-member tournament continued in 2014.

The winner is determined through league matches between the sides, and the club with the best record against both sides wins the trophy. As a result, the Whitecaps played three matches each against Portland and Seattle, winning the trophy for the second year in a row with a record of three wins (two against Seattle, one vs Portland), two losses (both to Portland), and a single draw with the Seattle Sounders, for a total of 10 points.

Updated as of October 10, 2014

Cascadia Scoring
Field players

Updated as of August 25, 2013

Cascadia Goalkeepers

Goalkeepers

Updated as of September 4, 2014

 Player stats 

 Goalkeeper stats 

{| border="1" cellpadding="4" cellspacing="0" style="margin: 1em 1em 1em 1em 0; background: #f9f9f9; border: 1px #aaa solid; border-collapse: collapse; font-size: 95%; text-align: center;"
|-
| rowspan="2" style="width:15px; text-align:center;"|No.| rowspan="2" style="width:15px; text-align:center;"|Nat.| rowspan="2" style="width:160px; text-align:center;"|Player| colspan="4" style="width:160px; text-align:center;"|Total| colspan="4" style="width:160px; text-align:center;"|Major League Soccer| colspan="4" style="width:160px; text-align:center;"|Canadian Championship| colspan="4" style="width:160px; text-align:center;"|MLS Cup Playoffs|-
| style="width: 40px;"|| style="width: 40px;"|| style="width: 40px;"|| style="width: 40px;"|| style="width: 40px;"|| style="width: 40px;"|| style="width: 40px;"|| style="width: 40px;"|| style="width: 40px;"|| style="width: 40px;"|| style="width: 40px;"|| style="width: 40px;"|| style="width: 40px;"|| style="width: 40px;"|| style="width: 40px;"|| style="width: 40px;"||-
| style="text-align: right;" |1
| 
| style="text-align: left;" |David Ousted
| 2,520| 77| 36| 1.29| 2,520
| 77
| 36
| 1.29
| 0
| 0
| 0
| 0
| 0
| 0
| 0
| 0
|-
| style="text-align: right;" |44
| 
| style="text-align: left;" |Marco Carducci
| 210| 8| 3| 1.50| 0
| 0
| 0
| 0
| 210
| 8
| 3
| 1.50
| 0
| 0
| 0
| 0
|-
| style="text-align: right;" |70
| 
| style="text-align: left;" |Paolo Tornaghi
| 0| 0| 0| 0'''
| 0
| 0
| 0
| 0
| 0
| 0
| 0
| 0
| 0
| 0
| 0
| 0

Top scorer 

Includes all competitive matches.

Top assists 

Includes all competitive matches.

Top minutes played 

Includes all competitive matches. The list is sorted by shirt number when total minutes are equal.

Disciplinary record
Includes all competitive matches. The list is sorted by position, and then shirt number.

Italic: denotes no longer with club.

Player Salaries

2014 Guaranteed Compensation

source:

References 

Vancouver Whitecaps FC seasons
Vancouver Whitecaps FC
Van
Vancouver Whitecaps